Jan Wagner may refer to:

 Jan Wagner (poet) (born 1971), German poet, essayist and translator, recipient of the Popescu Prize 
 Jan Costin Wagner (born 1972), German crime fiction writer
 Jan Wagner (conductor), Venezuelan conductor with the Odense Symphony Orchestra